Roser Aguilar (born 1971) is a Spanish film director and screenwriter.

Biography
Roser Aguilar earned a licentiate in journalism from the Autonomous University of Barcelona and a degree in film direction from the Cinema and Audiovisual School of Catalonia (ESCAC), as part of the school's first graduating class.

Produced by Escándalo Films (linked to ESCAC) and starring Marian Álvarez, Juan Sanz, Lluís Homar, Alberto Jiménez, and Carmen Machi, the film gained Aguilar widespread recognition in Spain. It also received multiple international awards, including the 2007 Silver Leopard (award for the best performer) for Marian Álvarez, and was nominated for the Golden Leopard for best director at the Locarno Festival, where it also won Boccalino D'Oro for Best Film of the festival, according to the Independent Review. At the  festival it won the public award, the critics' award, and the special jury award, and at the Latin Film Festival it received the public award in Tuebingen and Stuttgart, Germany.

In 2011, she directed Ahora no puedo, which won Best Short Film at the Gaudí Awards.

In 2017, Aguilar released Brava, a film starring Laia Marull which explores the feeling of loneliness, misunderstanding, and shame that torments victims of sexual violence after the aggression is reported. She began writing its script in 2009. It was presented in March at the Málaga Film Festival and reached theaters in July 2017.

Filmography

Director
 1997 – El llimoner, short
 1999 – Cuando te encontré, short
 2007 – , feature
 2008 – Mapa'08 Fosc, documentary
 2009 – Clara no lo esperaba, short
 2011 – Ahora no puedo, short
 2017 – Brava, feature

Screenwriter
 1997 – El llimoner, short
 1999 – Cuando te encontré, short
 2003 – Tarasca, TV
 2005 – Idéntics, TV
 2007 – Lo mejor de mí, feature
 2009 – Clara no lo esperaba, short
 2016 – Brava, feature

Assistant director
 1997 – En brazos de la mujer madura
 1999 – Discotheque
 2000 – Una bella inquietud

Actress
 Cinemacat.cat by

References

External links
 
 

1971 births
Autonomous University of Barcelona alumni
Living people
Spanish film actresses
Spanish film directors
Spanish women film directors
Spanish women screenwriters
University of Barcelona alumni
Writers from Barcelona